East Globe is a census-designated place in Gila County, Arizona, United States. As of the 2010 census it had a population of 226.

The racial and ethnic makeup of the population is 78.3% non-Hispanic Native Americans, 12.9% Hispanic Native Americans, 3.5% non-Hispanic whites, 0.4% Asian, 2.2% reporting two or more races and 2.6% non-Native American Hispanics.

Geography

Demographics

References

Census-designated places in Gila County, Arizona